The Grande Roue de Paris was a  tall Ferris wheel built in 1900 for the Exposition Universelle world exhibition at Paris. Financing the "Grande Roue de Paris" happened by the creation of the "Paris Gigantic Wheel and Varieties Company" and selling the shares of this company.

It was the tallest wheel in the world at the time of its opening.

Théodore Vienne, the industrialist and founder of the Paris–Roubaix cycle race, was both owner and director of the Grande Roue de Paris.

It was disassembled between 1920 and 1922 and rag-and-bone merchants used the pods as huts to carry on their trade. This evolved, through second-hand shops, into the antique trade that is now to be found on the site and known as the Swiss Village.

The passenger cars were removed from the wheel and used as homes for French families when the region was devastated by World War I. Almost 90 years passed between its construction and a taller wheel, the  Cosmo Clock 21, being built in Japan.

References

External links

La Grande Roue de 1900 à Paris
French wiki article re: Swiss Village
English website from the Swiss Village in Paris

Former Ferris wheels
Amusement rides introduced in 1900
Amusement rides that closed in 1920
World's fair architecture in Paris
Exposition Universelle (1900)
1920 disestablishments in France
Removed amusement attractions
19th-century architecture in France